Sin Jeong-seop (born 30 May 1974) is a South Korean volleyball player. He competed in the men's tournament at the 1996 Summer Olympics.

References

1974 births
Living people
South Korean men's volleyball players
Olympic volleyball players of South Korea
Volleyball players at the 1996 Summer Olympics
Place of birth missing (living people)
20th-century South Korean people